Marvin Gabriel Cabrera Ibarra (born 1 May 1980) is a Mexican former professional footballer who played as a right-back. He is the current head coach for the Guatemala under-17 national team.

Honours
Pachuca
Mexican Primera División: Clausura 2006, Clausura 2007
CONCACAF Champions' Cup: 2007, 2008
Copa Sudamericana: 2006
North American SuperLiga: 2007

External links

1980 births
Living people
Footballers from Mexico City
Association football fullbacks
Cruz Azul footballers
C.F. Pachuca players
Atlético Morelia players
Chiapas F.C. footballers
Deportivo Toluca F.C. players
Correcaminos UAT footballers
Liga MX players
Mexican footballers